Néstor Oswaldo Mora Zárate (20 September 1963 – 20 February 1995) was a racing cyclist from Colombia, who represented his native country in the individual road race at the 1984 Summer Olympics in Los Angeles.

Mora was born in Bogotá. He was a professional from 1985 to 1995, most notably winning a stage of the 1990 Vuelta a España. He died in 1995, aged 31, when he was hit by a truck in Manizales while training.

Major results

1984
 1st  Road race, National Road Championships
 8th Road race, Summer Olympics
1986
 7th Overall Route du Sud
1987
 1st Stage 2 Vuelta a Colombia
 1st Stage 9 Clásico RCN
1988
 1st Stage 10 Vuelta a Colombia
1990
 1st Stage 9 Vuelta a España
 1st Stage 2 Vuelta a Colombia
1991
 1st Clásica de Cundinamarca
 1st Clásica de Boyacá
 1st Stages 1 & 3 Setmana Catalana de Ciclisme
 1st Stages 3 & 13 Vuelta a Colombia
1992
 1st Clásica a los Puertos
1993
 1st Stage 10 Vuelta a Colombia
 1st Stage 5 Clásico RCN
 3rd Road race, National Road Championships

Grand Tour general classification results timeline

References

External links
 

1963 births
1995 deaths
Colombian male cyclists
Cyclists at the 1984 Summer Olympics
Olympic cyclists of Colombia
Sportspeople from Bogotá
Road incident deaths in Colombia
20th-century Colombian people